Ancalomicrobiaceae is a family of Alphaproteobacteria.

References

Hyphomicrobiales